Harry Armstrong may refer to:

Harry George Armstrong (1899–1983), U.S. Air Force surgeon who first described the Armstrong Limit
Harry Armstrong (politician) (1915–2011), Ohio Senator
Harry Armstrong (footballer) (1885–?), English footballer
 Harry Armstrong (composer) (1879–1951), American boxer and composer

See also
Harold Armstrong (disambiguation)
Henry Armstrong (disambiguation)